Andrew Cuerden is a Ballroom & Latin American dancer. Born in Zimbabwe, and growing up in South Africa, Cuerden moved to England to further his dance career in 1996. Dancing with partner Hanna Haarala they reached 4th place in the UK amateur Latin rankings, before turning pro on 5 February 2004. He, along with Haarala were chosen to tutor a celebrity in the third series of Strictly Come Dancing - partnered with Jaye Jacobs, he was eliminated in week 2, but performed in many professional demonstrations.

Previously ranked 25th in the world professional Latin rankings with professional partner Hanna Haarala, and 2nd in the Finnish Latin Rankings as well as reaching the Quarter Final of “The International Championships” Professional Latin 2006. Andrew and Hanna retired from competing in May 2008. 

Cuerden and Haarala continued to perform their Latin Emotion Cabaret show around the world ad well as touring with Brendan Cole’s “Live & Unjudged” stage show for 4 consecutive years, 2009-2012. 

Cuerden created Dance Savoir Faire Ltd in 2013. A company that offers Ballroom and Latin American Dance related events and services. 

Cuerden is also a Yoga Alliance accredited Yoga and meditation coach which he combines with his dance services and events to facilitate holistic well-being. 

In January 2021 Cuerden joined Soulhub Ltd   founded by Carmen Rendell to help co-create the wellbeing business and community including Soulwalk and the Soulhubbers Podcast.

References

External links
https://web.archive.org/web/20061205051012/http://andrewandhanna.co.uk/

English people of South African descent
British ballroom dancers
Living people
Year of birth missing (living people)